The 2012 FA WSL Cup Final was the second final of the FA WSL Cup, England's secondary cup competition for women's football teams and its primary league cup tournament. Arsenal beat Birmingham 1-0.

References

Cup
FA Women's Super League Cup finals
FA WSL Cup Final
FA WSL Cup Final, 2012